Gabriela Beatriz Estévez (born 11 February 1978) is an Argentine politician, currently serving as National Deputy representing Córdoba. A member of the Justicialist Party, Estévez was first elected in 2015 for the Front for Victory, and was re-elected in 2019 as part of the Frente de Todos. She is a member of La Cámpora.

Early life and education
Estévez was born on 11 February 1978 in Buenos Aires, to a family of Galician immigrants who had originally settled in Corrientes. She studied psychology at the Open University of Catalonia, graduating in 2008, and counts with a degree on Intra-family violence and Gender from Universidad Siglo XXI and a degree on social security from the International Social Security Association (ISSA).

Political career
Estévez was appointed advisor of the Executive Board of the Córdoba Women's Provincial Council in 2008, a position she held until 2010. From then, she was regional chief of the provincial branch of ANSES, from 2012 to 2015. She is a member of La Cámpora.

Estévez ran for a seat in the Argentine Chamber of Deputies in the 2015 general election; she was the first candidate in the Front for Victory list in Córdoba Province, ahead of Juan Manuel Pereyra. The Front for Victory list received 18.10% of the votes, and both Estévez and Pereyra were elected. She was sworn in on 10 December 2015.

As a national deputy, Estévez was a vocal supporter of the legalization of abortion in Argentina. She voted in favor of the two Voluntary Interruption of Pregnancy bills that were debated by the Argentine Congress in 2018 and 2020. She has also been a supporter of the expansion of LGBT rights, having authored and introduced the 2021 bill on travesti and trans labour quota, which was approved by Congress.

Ahead of the 2021 primary elections, she was confirmed as the second Frente de Todos candidate to the Argentine Senate in Córdoba Province, behind Senator Carlos Caserio.

References

External links

Profile on the official website of the Chamber of Deputies (in Spanish)

Living people
1978 births
Politicians from Buenos Aires
People from Córdoba, Argentina
Argentine people of Galician descent
Members of the Argentine Chamber of Deputies elected in Córdoba
Women members of the Argentine Chamber of Deputies
Justicialist Party politicians
Members of La Cámpora
21st-century Argentine politicians
21st-century Argentine women politicians